This is a list of games and game lines produced by Hasbro, a large toy and game company based in the United States, or one of its former subsidiaries such as Parker Brothers and Milton Bradley Company.

0-9
 13 Dead End Drive

A
 Acquire
 Aggravation
 Attacktix: the Battle Figure Game
 Amidar (Atari 2600 port of the arcade game)
 Awkward Hugs
 Axis and Allies

B
 Basket Bounce
 Battleship
 BedBugs 
 Betrayal at House on the Hill
 Black Box
 Blockhead! 
 Beyblade Burst
 Beyblade Burst Evolution 
 Beyblade Burst Turbo 
Beyblade Burst Rise 
 Blowfish Blowup
 Boggle
 Bonkers!
 Bop Bop 'n Rebop
 Bop It!
 Bowl-A-Tron 300 Automatic Bowling Game
 Buckaroo

C
 Camelot
 Candy Land
 Can't Stop
 Caught on Tape
 Cranium (Cadoo version recall in effect, lead paint hazard)
 Careers
 Castle Risk
 Catch Phrase
 Challenge The Yankees
 Chow Crown
 Clue (Cluedo)
 Coinhole Touchdown 
 Conflict
 Connect 4
 Contact
 Crazy Candles 
 Crocodile Dentist 
 Crossfire
 Cuponk

D
 Deer Pong
 Diplomacy
 Domain
 Dont Break the Ice
 Don't Miss The Boat
 Dont Step In It
 Don't Lose Your Cool
 Don't Wake Daddy
 Downfall
 Downspin
 Drac's Night Out
 Draw Something
 Dropmix
 Dungeons & Dragons: The Fantasy Adventure Board Game
 Dungeons & Dragons (Roleplaying Game)
 Dunk Hat

E
 Escape from Atlantis
 Escape from Colditz
 Eggedon

F
 Fantastic Gymnastics Game
 Fantastic Gymnastics Game Vault Challenge
 Finance
 Flinch
 Frogger
 Frogger II
 Frustration

G
 The Game of Life
 The Game of Life Card Game
 Get a Grip
 The Game of Things
 G.I. Joe: Cobra Strike
 Gnip Gnop
 The Grape Escape
 Guesstures

H
 Hex
 Hey Pa! There's a Goat on the Roof
 HiHo! Cherry-O
 Hold that Face Game
 Hollywood Squares
 Hot Tub High Dive 
 Hungry Hungry Hippos

J
 James Bond 007
 Jenga

K
 Krypto

L
 Landslide
 Lie Detector Game
 Lord of the Rings: Journey to Rivendell

M
 M.A.G.S. (Music Activated Gaming System)
 The Mad Magazine Card Game
 The Mad Magazine Game
 Magic: The Gathering (Hasbro's top-selling brand)
 Make-A-Million
 Malarkey
 The Mansion of Happiness
 Mastermind
 Masterpiece
 Merlin
 Mille Bornes
 Mind Maze
 Monopoly (best selling board game ever according to the Guinness Book of World Records)
 Monopoly Deal
 Montezuma's Revenge
 Mouse Trap
 Mr. Toast (Also Known As Irresponsibility)
 Mystery Mansion

O
 Outburst
 Operation

P
 Pay Day
 Peeing Puppy
 Perfection 
 Pictureka
 Pie Face, Pie Face Showdown, Pie Face Sky High & Pie Face Cannon
 Pit
 Plumber Pants 
 Pokémon Master Trainer
 Pollyanna
 Porcupine Pop
 Probe
 Pour Taste

Q
 Qubic

R
 Rack-O
 Raising Hell
 Risk
 Rook
 Rummikub
 Rubik's Cube

S
 Scattergories
 Scrabble
 Shadowlord
 Simon Air Game
 Simon Micro Game
 Simon Optix Game
 The Slow-Motion Race Game
 Sorry!

 Speak Out
 Speech Breaker
 Spinja
 Spite and Malice
 Star Wars: The Empire Strikes Back (Game produced for the Atari 2600 gaming system)
 Star Wars: Jedi Arena
 Star Wars: Return of the Jedi: Ewok Adventure
 Stratego
 Super Cobra

T
 Tales of the Crystals
Tiny Pong
Toilet Trouble 
 Touring
 Trivial Pursuit
 Taboo
 The Tonight Show Starring Jimmy Fallon Games
 Trouble
 Transformers: Human Alliance
 Trump: The Game
 Twister (game)

U
 Upwords

W
 Walt Disney's Sleeping Beauty (A board game based on the related film)
 Waterworks
 Wide World
 Words With Friends (board game versions)

See also
 List of Hasbro toys

References

External links
Official Hasbro website

Hasbro